Miladinovtsi may refer to:

 In Bulgaria (written in Cyrillic as Миладиновци):
 Miladinovtsi, Dobrich Province - a village in the Dobritchka municipality, Dobrich Province
 Miladinovtsi, Targovishte Province - a village in the Targovishte municipality, Targovishte Province
 Miladinovtsi, Yambol Province - a village in the Tundzha municipality, Yambol Province
 In the Republic of North Macedonia (written in Cyrillic as Миладиновци):
 Miladinovtsi, North Macedonia - a village in Ilinden Municipality